A  clamp is a compact heap, mound or pile of materials. A storage clamp is used in the agricultural industry for temporary storage of root crops such as potato, turnip, rutabaga, mangelwurzel, and sugar beet.

A clamp is formed by excavating a shallow rectangular depression in a field to make a base for the clamp. When the clamp is full, the earth scraped from the field to make the base is then used to cover the root crops to a depth of several inches. Straw or old hay may be used to protect the upper surface from rain erosion.

A well-made clamp will keep the vegetables cool and dry for many months. Most clamps are relatively long and narrow, allowing the crops to be progressively removed from one end without disturbing the remaining vegetables. The use of a clamp allows a farmer to feed vegetables into market over many months.

See also
 Food preservation
 Root cellar
 Brick clamp
 Charcoal clamp
 CLAMP, an artist collective named after potato clamps

References

External links

 How to make a Storage Clamp - Green Chronicle

Food preservation
Agricultural terminology